Ivor Thord-Gray (born Thord Ivar Hallström) (April 17, 1878 – August 18, 1964) was a Swedish-born adventurer, sailor, prison guard, soldier, government official, police officer, rubber plantation owner, ethnologist, linguist, investor, and author. He participated in thirteen wars spanning the continents of Africa, Asia, North America, and Europe.

Early life
Thord Ivar Hallström was born in the Södermalm district in central Stockholm, Kingdom of Sweden as the second son of a primary school teacher, August Hallström, and his wife Hilda. His eldest brother was the artist Gunnar August Hallström (1875–1943). His youngest brother was the archaeologist Gustaf Hallström (1880–1962).

Military service and civilian employment (1893-1919)

Africa

South Africa
 Joined Merchant Marine and sailed on three ships from 1893-1895 leaving later to settle in Cape Town, South Africa
 Worked as a Prison Guard on Robben Island in 1896
 In 1897 he enlisted in the Cape Mounted Riflemen as a Private and fought in the Boer War in 1899–1902
 Served in the South African Constabulary 1902–1903
 Transvaal Colony Civil Service 1903–1906
 Captain in the Lydenburg Militia 1904
 Joined Royston's Horse as a Lieutenant and fought in the Bambatha Rebellion 1906 being promoted Captain.

Kenya
 Captain of Nairobi Mounted Police 1907

Asia

Philippines
 Captain Philippine Constabulary ("US Foreign Legion") 1908–1909

Malaya
 Planter in Malaya 1909–1911.

China
 Served a short time in the Chinese Revolution 1913

Mexico
 Joined Mexican Revolution as Captain and Commander of Pancho Villa's artillery 1913
 Promoted Major, Lieutenant-Colonel and Colonel 1914 
 Chief of Staff 1st Mexican Army 1914

Britain
 Joined British Army 1914, and served in the First World War. His initial rank was of Major and he was the second in command of 15th Battalion Northumberland Fusiliers
 Lieutenant-Colonel and Commanding officer of 11th Battalion Northumberland Fusiliers in 1915, and then 1/26th Battalion Royal Fusiliers in 1916
 Awarded 1914–15 Star, British War Medal, and Allied Victory Medal
 Lieutenant-Colonel in the Canadian Siberian Expeditionary Force, which was deployed as part of the Allied intervention in the Russian Civil War in 1918.

Russia
 Transferred to Russian "White" Army February 1919 as Colonel
 Commanding Officer of 1st Siberian Assault Division
 Major General November 1919 and High Representative of the Provisional Siberian Government to the Allied Expeditionary Corps in Vladivostok

Back to Sweden
In 1923, Ivor Thord-Gray returned to Sweden and wrote a book about Mexican archeology Från Mexicos forntid : bland tempelruiner och gudabilder.

United States
In 1925 Thord-Gray moved to the United States and established I.T. Gray & Co, an investment bank located at 522 Fifth Avenue in New York City. He became a citizen of the United States in 1934. He was married to Josephine Toerge-Schaefer  (1925–1932) who had two children, Edward and Frances. He was subsequently married to Winnifred Ingersoll (1933–1960). In 1929, he established residence at Gray Court in Belle Haven in Greenwich, Connecticut. In August 1935 he was appointed Major-General and Chief-of-Staff to Governor David Sholtz of Florida.

In 1955, he wrote Tarahumara-English, English-Tarahumara dictionary and an introduction to Tarahumara grammar. (Coral Gables, Fla., University of Miami Press, 1955). He also wrote a book about his experiences in the Mexican Revolution, Gringo Rebel: Mexico 1913–1914 (Coral Gables, Fla. : University of Miami Press, 1961).  In later years he had his winter home in Coral Gables, Florida.

References

 Thord Ivar Hallströms handlingar - Some 1,000 letters and documents regarding Ivor Thord-Gray deposited in the Kungliga Biblioteket in Stockholm

Other sources
Bojerud, Stellan Ivor Thord-Gray - Soldat under 13 fanor (Sivart Förlag AB, Stockholm. 2008)  
Gyllenhaal, Lars & Westberg, Lennart Swedes at War (Aberjona Press, Bedford, PA, 2010), 
Langer, Joakim  Mannen som hittade Tarzan (Sivart Förlag AB, Stockholm, 2008) .
Arrioja, Adolfo Vizcaíno El sueco que se fue con Pancho Villa (Editorial Océano de México, 2000) 
Turner, Timothy G. Bullets, Bottles and Gardenias (Southwest Press 1937)
Tunis, Edwin Weapons: a pictorial history P61 (The Johns Hopkins University Press 1999)

External links
 Gray Court, estate of Major General Ivor Thord-Gray at Belle Haven in Greenwich, Connecticut

1878 births
1964 deaths
Military personnel from Stockholm
Swedish emigrants to the United States
Swedish mercenaries
American ethnologists
Linguists from the United States
American mercenaries
American male writers
People with acquired American citizenship
People from Greenwich, Connecticut
People from Coral Gables, Florida
People of the Mexican Revolution
People of the 1911 Revolution
People of the Second Boer War
Canadian military personnel of the Russian Civil War
American bankers
British Army personnel of World War I
Royal Northumberland Fusiliers officers
Royal Fusiliers officers